Victor Mohica (born Victor Mojica; July 31, 1933 – October 17, 2019) was an American actor. Though of Puerto Rican descent, he often portrayed Native Americans in his roles. His works include guest-star episode of Dark Shadows television series in 1969, featured actor in an episode of the Bearcats! television series in the fall of 1971, featured actor in the pilot episode of Ellery Queen television series in 1975, Little House on the Prairie Pilot Movie in 1974 and West Side Story Broadway version in 1968. His film credits include roles in Showdown (1973), Johnny Firecloud (1975), Victory at Entebbe (1976), Don't Answer the Phone (1980), The Final Countdown (1980), The Ghost Dance (1980) and Blood In Blood Out (1993).

Filmography

The Boy Who Stole a Million (1960) - Chico
Harbor Lights (1963) - Cardinal's Man (uncredited)
Operación Tiburón (1967)
Together (1971)
 BANACEK-Detour to Nowhere (March 1972) - Joe Hawk
Showdown (1973) - Big Eye
Little House on the Prairie (1975) - Soldat du Chene
Johnny Firecloud (1975) - Johnny Firecloud
Victory at Entebbe (1976, TV movie) - Jaif
Stunts Unlimited (1980, TV movie) - Joe Tallia
Don't Answer the Phone (1980) - Ventura
The Final Countdown (1980) - Black Cloud
The Ghost Dance (1980) - Tom Eagle
Diplomatic Immunity (1991) - Customs Officer
Blackbelt (1992) - Emil Zolan
Blood In Blood Out (1993) - Mano (final film role)

References

External links

1933 births
2019 deaths
20th-century American male actors
American male film actors
American male television actors
Male actors from New York City
American people of Puerto Rican descent